The Kadéï River is a tributary of the Sangha River that flows through Cameroon and the Central African Republic. Its total drainage basin is 24,000 km. The river rises from the eastern Adamawa Plateau, southeast of Garoua-Boulaï in Cameroon's East Province. The Kadéï is swelled by two tributaries, the Doumé at Mindourou and the Boumbé, before flowing east into the Central African Republic. At Nola, the Kadéï meets the Mambéré and becomes the Sangha. The Kadéï is part of the Congo River basin.

See also
Communes of Cameroon

References 

 Gwanfogbe, Mathew, Ambrose Meligui, Jean Moukam, and Jeanette Nguoghia (1983). Geography of Cameroon. Hong Kong: Macmillan Education Ltd.
 Neba, Aaron (1999). Modern Geography of the Republic of Cameroon, 3rd ed. Bamenda: Neba Publishers.

Rivers of Cameroon
Rivers of the Central African Republic
International rivers of Africa
Tributaries of the Sangha River